Paul Charles Craft (August 12, 1938 – October 18, 2014) was an American country singer-songwriter. The Memphis-born Craft was known as the songwriter for Mark Chesnutt's single "Brother Jukebox", and the novelty song "It's Me Again, Margaret", recorded by Ray Stevens, and Craft himself. Between 1977 and 1978, Craft charted three singles on RCA Nashville.

His song "Keep Me From Blowing Away" was originally recorded by The Seldom Scene on their 1973 album Act II and was then recorded by Linda Ronstadt on her 1974 album Heart Like a Wheel, and has since been recorded by Moe Bandy, T. Graham Brown, Jerry Lee Lewis, The Grascals and Willie Nelson. His song "Midnight Flyer" was recorded by the Eagles. His song "Dropkick Me, Jesus" was a No. 17 country hit for Bobby Bare in 1976. He also wrote Moe Bandy's "Hank Williams, You Wrote My Life" and T. Graham Brown's "Come as You Were" among others.

Craft was inducted into the Nashville Songwriters Hall of Fame on October 5, 2014.

Craft died at a hospital in Nashville, Tennessee on October 18, 2014, at the age of 76.

Discography

References

External links
 biography [archived from the original]

Paul Craft Interview NAMM Oral History Library (2009)

1938 births
2014 deaths
American country singer-songwriters
Musicians from Memphis, Tennessee
RCA Records Nashville artists
Singer-songwriters from Tennessee
Country musicians from Tennessee